The 2015–16 season will be the 69th season in Osijek’s history and their twenty-fifth in the Prva HNL.

First-team squad

Competitions

Overall

Prva HNL

Table

Results summary

Results by round

Matches

Legend

Pre-season friendlies

Mid-season friendlies

Prva HNL

Croatian Football Cup

Player seasonal records
Competitive matches only. Updated to games played 14 May 2016.

Top scorers

Source: Competitive matches

Transfers

In

Out

Loans in

Loans out

References

2015-16
Croatian football clubs 2015–16 season